Slingsby railway station is a disused railway station that served the village of Slingsby in North Yorkshire, England. It was built on the orders of the Earl of Carlisle, the local landowner, opened in 1853 and closed to regular passenger trains on 1 January 1931, but remained open for freight traffic and occasional special passenger trains until 10 August 1964. The station was the only one on the Thirsk and Malton line to be built of stone. It had a single platform that was originally very low, but parts of it were raised to the standard height for NER platforms of 2' 6" after 1865. The goods yard consisted of four sidings, three on the up side and one on the down side of the line. A passing loop on the latter siding that had been taken out of use early in the station's history was reinstated and lengthened in 1943 for unloading ammunition. There were a brick and a timber warehouse, a second brick warehouse was built in 1858 at the request of a corn merchant.

References

External links
 Slingsby station on navigable 1947 O. S. map

Disused railway stations in North Yorkshire
Railway stations in Great Britain opened in 1853
Railway stations in Great Britain closed in 1931
Former North Eastern Railway (UK) stations